The Revolution and the French Establishments in India (1790 - 1793) (2019) is a historical book edited by Indian writer Arghya Bose and co-translated by Arghya Bose and Sandhia Vasseur. It recounts the tumultuous events that closely followed in the French colonies of Pondicherry, Chandannagar, Mahé, Karaikal, and Yanaon after the French Revolution in metropolitan France.

References

Indian non-fiction books
2019 non-fiction books
21st-century history books